Arvidsson is a Swedish surname. Notable people with the surname include:

Agnes Arvidsson (1875–1962), Swedish pharmacist
Eric Arvidsson or Eric Trolle (1460–1530), elected regent of Sweden in 1512 during the era of Kalmar Union
Eva Arvidsson (born 1948), Swedish politician
Gösta Arvidsson (1925–2012), Swedish shot putter
Inga-Stina Arvidsson (1919–1999), Anglo-Swedish political activist
Isak Arvidsson (born 1992), Swedish tennis player
Jesper Arvidsson (born 1985), Swedish football player
Lillemor Arvidsson (1943–2012), Swedish trade union leader, Governor of Gotland 1998–2004
Magnus Arvidsson (athlete) (born 1983), Swedish javelin thrower
Magnus Arvidsson (footballer) (born 1973), Swedish football player
Margareta Arvidsson (born 1947), 1966 Miss Universe
Mats Arvidsson (born 1958), Swedish football player
Pär Arvidsson (born 1960), Swedish swimmer
Per-Olof Arvidsson (1864–1947), Swedish sport shooter
Sofia Arvidsson (born 1984), Swedish tennis player
Torbjörn Arvidsson (born 1968), Swedish football player
Viktor Arvidsson (born 1993), Swedish ice hockey player

See also
Arvidson (disambiguation)
Arwidsson

Swedish-language surnames